Calodesma tamara is a moth of the family Erebidae. It was described by Hering in 1925. It is found in Brazil and French Guiana.

References

Calodesma
Moths described in 1925